The Sierolomorphidae are a family of 13 extant species of wasps, in the genera Sierolomorpha and Proscleroderma, mostly found in the Northern Hemisphere. They are rare and very little is known of their biology. A fossil species Loreisomorpha nascimbenei has also been placed in the family.

The coxa (basal segment of the leg) of the hind and midlegs are next to each other, and the hindwing does not have claval or jugal lobes. The first metasomal segment does not have a true node, but can appear like that of the ants. The metasomal sternum of the first segment is separated from the second by a constriction. Sexual dimorphism varies among species from slight to marked, with both males and females having wings, but females are sometimes wingless. Adults are predominantly dark brown or black in colour. They are solitary and the larvae are suspected to be ectoparasitoids of other insects.

Diversity 
There are 13 known living species with 5 from the Palaearctic Region; 7 from North and Central America; and 1 from Hawaii. Species include:

Extant taxa
 Proscleroderma punctatum  (from Syria)
 Sierolomorpha similis  (N. America)
 Sierolomorpha nigrescens  (N. America)
 Sierolomorpha isis  (Uzbekistan)
 Sierolomorpha hospes  (Hawaii)
 Sierolomorpha canadensis  (N. America)
 Sierolomorpha brevicornis  (N. America)
 Sierolomorpha bicolor  (N. America)
 Sierolomorpha barri  (N. America)
 Sierolomorpha atropos  (Mongolia, Eastern Russia)
 Sierolomorpha apache  (N. America)
 Sierolomorpha sogdiana  (from Uzbekistan)
 Sierolomorpha trjapitzini  (from Eastern Russia)

Extinct taxa
  Loreisomorpha nascimbenei  (Described from Late Cretaceous amber of New Jersey)

References

External links
 

Tiphioidea
Apocrita families